Hastinapur Assembly constituency is one of the 403 constituencies of the Uttar Pradesh Legislative Assembly, India. It is a part of the Meerut district and one of the five assembly constituencies in the Bijnor Lok Sabha constituency. First election in this assembly constituency was held in 1957 after the "DPACO (1956)" order was passed and the constituency was constituted in 1956. The constituency was assigned identification number 45 after the "Delimitation of Parliamentary and Assembly Constituencies Order, 2008" was passed. In 1991 and 1993, elections were not held in this constituency. Since 1967, Hastinapur Assembly constituency is a reserved seat for SC candidates. Gurjar are the main vote in this constituency with over 1 lakh votes.

Wards / Areas
Extent of Hastinapur Assembly constituency is KCs Hastinapur, Parikshatgarh, PCs Tatina, Niloha, Bana, Bhainsa, Mawana Kalan-I, Mawana Khurd, Mubarikpur, Sandhan, Dhikoli of Mawana KC, Mawana MB, Bahsooma NP, Hastinapur NP & Parikshatgarh NP of Mawana Tehsil.

Members of the Legislative Assembly

Election results

2022

2017 General Elections

2012 General Elections.

See also
Bijnor Lok Sabha constituency
Meerut district
Sixteenth Legislative Assembly of Uttar Pradesh
Uttar Pradesh Legislative Assembly

References

External links
 

Assembly constituencies of Uttar Pradesh
Politics of Meerut district
Constituencies established in 1956
1956 establishments in Uttar Pradesh